Bulatovo is a rural locality (a settlement) in Krasnovishersky District, Perm Krai, Russia. The population was 522 as of 2010. There are 4 streets.

Geography 
Bulatovo is located 34 km southwest of Krasnovishersk (the district's administrative centre) by road. Berezovaya Staritsa is the nearest rural locality.

References 

Rural localities in Krasnovishersky District